Meth is the fifteenth solo album by Z-Ro, released on September 20, 2011 through Rap-a-Lot Records and Universal Republic Records. It is the fourth entry in Z-Ro's "drug series". It features artists: Bun B, Slim Thug, Yo Gotti, Dallas Blocker, Just Brittany, and Willie D.

Track listing

Sample credits
"Never Had Love" Contains a sample of "Blind Man Can See It" by James Brown
"3 Way Relationship" Contains a sample of "Me and My Girlfriend" by Makaveli

Chart history

References

2011 albums
Albums produced by Honorable C.N.O.T.E.
Z-Ro albums
Rap-A-Lot Records albums